President Taylor may refer to:
 Zachary Taylor (1784–1850), 12th president of the United States
 Charles Taylor (Liberian politician) (born 1948), 22nd president of Liberia

Other uses
 SS President Taylor, named for the 12th president of the United States

See also
 Taylor (disambiguation)